Lawrence Edward Reade (8 November 1846 – 17 August 1910) was a New Zealand cricketer. He played first-class cricket for Canterbury and Otago between 1869 and 1877.

Early life and family
Lawrence Reade was born in India, where his father, Edward Anderton Reade, was an administrator for the East India Company in the Bengal Presidency. One of Lawrence's uncles was the novelist Charles Reade. Lawrence attended Tonbridge School in Kent before moving to New Zealand in 1869 and completing his legal studies in Dunedin. He moved to Oamaru in 1873, and in 1875 was admitted to the bar.

Cricket career
Reade was a batsman and a "right-hand medium-paced bowler, with a graceful delivery". Playing for Otago against Canterbury in 1870-71 he top-scored in each innings with 33 and 22 and also had Otago's best bowling figures of 4 for 73. He made his highest score of 38 against Canterbury in 1873-74, when he put on a partnership of 96 for the second wicket in a match in which Canterbury's two innings totalled only 116. When James Lillywhite's XI made short work of Southland in 1876-77, Reade, Southland's captain, top-scored in each innings, with 8 and 10.

He retained his interest in cricket as a player and an umpire for the rest of his life.

Later career and personal life
Reade married Margaret Hannah Booth in Oamaru on 15 March 1876. They lived in several places in New Zealand and Australia. He was elected mayor of the Borough of East Invercargill in 1884, and later served as a commissioner with the Supreme Courts of Tasmania and New South Wales. Eventually they settled in Foxton, Manawatu, where Lawrence worked as a solicitor.

They had three sons. Margaret died on 14 August 1908, aged 60. On 2 July 1910, while visiting a son in Wellington, Lawrence fell from a tram and suffered a brain injury, from which he died on 17 August.

See also
 List of Otago representative cricketers

References

External links

1846 births
1910 deaths
People from Gorakhpur
People educated at Tonbridge School
New Zealand cricketers
Canterbury cricketers
Otago cricketers
19th-century New Zealand lawyers
Accidental deaths from falls